The Order of Saint Nicholas Thaumaturgus  is a Ukrainian order awarded, as the inscription says (in Ukrainian): "For the Multiplying of the Good on the Earth", issued by the Foundation of International Awards ("Фонд міжнародних премій"), Ukraine.

Recipients
Taisia Povaliy, Ukrainian singer, 1998

References

Orders, decorations, and medals of Ukraine